The AFC Annual Awards are awards given by the Asian Football Confederation (AFC) to the most outstanding performers of the Asian football season. The awards are presented at the end of each year at a special gala.

Player awards

Men's Player of the Year

Asian International Player of the Year

Women's Player of the Year

Youth Player of the Year

The Youth Player of the Year award is presented to the best young football player from Asia. Officially awarded since 1995 with the first award shared between two players Oman, and Syria namely, Mohammed Al-Kathiri and Shadi Gilke.

Youth Player of the Year (Men)

Youth Player of the Year (Women)

Foreign Player of the Year

Asian All Stars

Futsal Player of the Year

Coaching awards

Coach of the Year

Men's Coach of the Year

Women's Coach of the Year

Team awards

National Team of the Year

Club of the Year

Futsal Team of the Year

Association awards

Association of the Year

Fair Play Association of the Year

Inspiring Member Association of the Year

Developing Member Association of the Year

Aspiring Member Association of the Year

President Recognition Award for Grassroots Football

Dream Asia Award

Other awards

Referee of the Year

Diamond of Asia

Match Commissioner of the Year

Special Recognition Award

Corporate Icon Award

Sportswriter of the Year

See also
 Asian Football Hall of Fame
 AFC Century Award

References

External links
 AFC Annual Awards

Asian Football Confederation trophies and awards
Asian football trophies and awards